Płonna  (Polonna), in Plone 1433, de Plona 1437, villa Plona 1451, Plonna 1508, Płonna 1699, village in eastern Lesser Poland in the Lesser Beskid mountains, Bukowsko rural commune,  located near the towns of Medzilaborce and Palota (in northeastern Slovakia).

Since 1999 it is situated in the Subcarpathian Voivodship (province); previously in Krosno Voivodship (1975–1998) and Sanok district, ( east of Sanok), parish Bukowsko.

History

Płonna was founded in 1433 by Bal. During 966–1018, 1340–1772 (Ruthenian Voivodeship) and during 1918–1939 Płonna was part of Poland. During 1772–1918 it belonged to the Austrian empire, and later the Austrian-Hungarian empire when double monarchy was introduced in Austria. In 1785 the village lands comprised . Prior to the Second World War, the village was populated by a majority of Lemko Greek Catholics, and some Jewish families.  In Spring, 1946, the village was burned by the Polish Communist Army for the Polish government (PKWN), and all villagers that the Polish Army could locate were forcibly deported.  In 1947, during Akcja Wisla (Operation Vistula), the remainder of Lemkos who were not previously sent to Soviet Ukraine were finally captured and deported to former German territories that Poland had acquired as a provision of the Yalta Conference.  Their land plots were joined to form a collective farm, the remains of which still remain in the village, and the church was turned into a barn.

The church at Płonna is on the main road and easily accessible.  Filial churches were located in Wysoczany ( away) and Kożuszne. The cemetery contains only a few headstones.

Holocaust History
Płonna was the site of a "special camp" in 1942. Apparently at least 13,000 people were held at Zaslaw and then transported to Belzec extermination camp. Elderly Jews were shot in the woods near Zaslaw, according to "The Holocaust: The Jews in the County of Cracau".

Population

See also
Komancza Republic (November 1918 – January 1919)

References

Literature
 Adam Fastnacht, Nagórzany [in:] Slownik Historyczno-Geograficzny Ziemi Sanockiej w Średniowieczu (Historic-Geographic Dictionary of the Sanok District in the Middle Ages), Kraków, (II edition 2002), .
Jerzy Zuba "W Gminie Bukowsko". Roksana, 2004, . Translated by Deborah Greenlee. Arlington, TX 76016.

External links
Geographical Dictionary of the Kingdom of Poland and other Slavic Lands Słownik geograficzny Królestwa Polskiego i innych krajów słowiańskich. Warszawa. 1876. (digital edition)
Map of Płonna

Villages in Sanok County
1433 establishments in Europe
Populated places established in the 1430s
Holocaust locations in Poland
15th-century establishments in Poland